Milan Jurdík (born 8 November 1991 in Považská Bystrica) is a Czech professional footballer who plays as a forward.

Career

Club career
Jurdík started his career in the Czech Republic with Sparta Prague. He made his professional debut in March 2010 in the Czech First League against Sigma Olomouc. It was his only game for Sparta. In the summer of 2010 he joined Příbram on loan until December 2011. After three more loan spells, he left Sparta in the summer of 2015 and joined the Dynamo České Budějovice.

For the 2016/17 season he moved to the Austrian Football Second League club WSG Wattens. He helped the club winning the league title and with promotion to the Austrian Football Bundesliga, after which the club was renamed WSG Tirol. After nine appearances in the Bundesliga and 95 in the second division, his contract was terminated in January 2020 and he moved to the second division club Floridsdorfer AC, where he signed a contract that ran until June 2021.

On 3 July 2021, Jurdík moved to Maltese club Valletta.

References

External links
 Profile at iDNES.cz 
 Guardian Football Stats
 

1991 births
Living people
Sportspeople from Považská Bystrica
Czech footballers
Czech expatriate footballers
AC Sparta Prague players
1. FK Příbram players
FC Zbrojovka Brno players
FK Baník Sokolov players
MFK Karviná players
SK Dynamo České Budějovice players
WSG Tirol players
Floridsdorfer AC players
Valletta F.C. players
FK Senica players
Czech First League players
Czech National Football League players
2. Liga (Austria) players
Austrian Football Bundesliga players
Maltese Premier League players
Slovak Super Liga players
Association football forwards
Czech expatriate sportspeople in Austria
Czech expatriate sportspeople in Slovakia
Expatriate footballers in Austria
Expatriate footballers in Malta
Expatriate footballers in Slovakia